Multipath is the propagation phenomenon that results in radio signals reaching the receiving antenna by two or more paths.

Multipath may also refer to:

 Multipath I/O, in operating system input/output subsystems
 Multipath routing, in packet switching networks
 Multipath TCP, in computer networks

See also
 Solaris IP network multipathing

de:Mehrwegempfang
fr:Multipath
ko:다중경로
it:Multipath fading
nl:Multipath fading
ja:マルチパス
sv:Flervägsfel